Stray Cats is the first studio album by American rockabilly band Stray Cats, first released in the United Kingdom by Arista Records in February 1981. It was produced by the band and Dave Edmunds.

The album was successful in Britain, peaking at No. 6 on the UK Albums Chart, and produced the UK Singles Chart top 40 hits "Runaway Boys" (No. 9), "Rock This Town" (No. 9) and "Stray Cat Strut" (No. 11). The Rock and Roll Hall of Fame later listed "Rock This Town" as one of the "500 Songs that Shaped Rock and Roll".

The fifth track on the album, "Storm the Embassy" was based on the song "Boys Having Babies" recorded in 1979 by Brian Setzer's previous band The Bloodless Pharaohs.  The lyrics were subsequently rewritten about the Iran hostage crisis of 1979–80.

The album was only issued in the United States after the success of the band's first American album, 1982's Built for Speed. However, six of the songs from Stray Cats ("Rock This Town", "Stray Cat Strut", "Rumble in Brighton", "Runaway Boys", "Double Talkin' Baby" and "Jeanie, Jeanie, Jeanie") were already included on Built for Speed.

Track listing

Personnel
Credits are adapted from the album's liner notes.

Stray Cats
Brian Setzer – guitar, vocals
Slim Jim Phantom – drums
Lee Rocker – bass

Additional musicians
Gary Barnacle – saxophone

Production
Aldo Bocca – engineering
Dave Edmunds – production
Hein Hoven – engineering
Neil – tape operation
Nick – tape operation
Brian Setzer – production
Stray Cats – production

Design
Gavin Cochrane – photography
Chalkie Davies – photography
Alain de la Mata – photography
Chris Gabrin – photography
Malcolm Garrett – sleeve design
Toshi Yajima – photography

Charts

Weekly charts

Year-end charts

Certifications

References

1981 debut albums
Stray Cats albums
Arista Records albums
Albums produced by Dave Edmunds